The Wright R-975 Whirlwind was a series of nine-cylinder air-cooled radial aircraft engines built by the Wright Aeronautical division of Curtiss-Wright. They were the largest members of the Wright Whirlwind engine family to be produced commercially, and they were also the most numerous.

During World War II, Continental Motors built the R-975 under license as a powerplant for Allied tanks and other armored vehicles. Tens of thousands of engines were built for this purpose, dwarfing the R-975's usage in aircraft, where it was overshadowed by the similar Pratt & Whitney R-985. After the war, Continental continued to produce its own versions of the R-975 into the 1950s.

The R-975 powered the American World War II M18 Hellcat tank destroyer which was claimed to have been the fastest tracked armored vehicle until the introduction of the turbine powered M1 Abrams in the 1980s.

Design and development
Wright introduced the J-6 Whirlwind family in 1928 to replace the nine-cylinder R-790 series. The J-6 family included varieties with five, seven, and nine cylinders.  The nine-cylinder version was originally known as the J-6 Whirlwind Nine, or J-6-9 for short.  The U.S. government designated it as the R-975; Wright later adopted this and dropped the J-6 nomenclature.

Like all the members of the J-6 Whirlwind family, the R-975 had larger cylinders than the R-790. The piston stroke of 5.5 in (14.0 cm) was unchanged, but the cylinder bore was expanded to 5.0 in (12.7 cm) from the R-790's bore of 4.5 in (11.4 cm). While the R-790 was naturally aspirated, the R-975, like the other J-6 engines, had a gear-driven supercharger to boost its power output.

Wright gradually developed the R-975, at first using suffix letters to indicate successive versions. The original R-975 (or J-6-9) was rated for 300 hp (224 kW), while the R-975E of 1931 could do 330 hp (246 kW) thanks to an improved cylinder head design. Wright later added numeric suffixes to show different power levels. The R-975E-1, introduced the same year as the R-975E, was rated at 365 hp (272 kW) thanks to higher-compression pistons and a slightly greater RPM limit. An even more powerful version, the R-975E-3, was also introduced that year, with greater supercharging and a still higher RPM limit, and was progressively refined until the final model of 1935 could reach 450 hp (336 kW) for takeoff.

Operational history
As the most powerful Whirlwind to be produced commercially was also the most successful. It powered a wide variety of civil utility aircraft, such as the Beechcraft Staggerwing, and various airliners, such as the Ford 4-AT-E Trimotor and the Lockheed 10B Electra. In addition, it powered U.S. military training aircraft including the North American BT-9 and Vultee BT-15 Valiant for the Army and the Curtiss-Wright SNC Falcon for the Navy. The Curtiss F9C Sparrowhawk parasite fighter operated from U.S. Navy airships was also powered by the R-975.

However, the R-975 faced heavy competition from Pratt & Whitney's R-985 Wasp Junior and from their larger R-1340 Wasp. Pratt & Whitney R-985 outsold the Wright R-975 by a wide margin.

Wright's production of the R-975 ceased in 1945, with over 7,000 engines being produced by the company.

Production by Continental Motors

In 1939 the U.S. Army, which had been using Continental R-670 radial engines in its light tanks, chose Continental Motors to build the R-975 under license as the engine for its M2 medium tanks. Subsequently, the same engine was selected for the M3 Lee medium tank, the M4 Sherman medium tank, the Canadian Ram tank (which used the M3 chassis), the M7 Priest self-propelled gun, the M18 Hellcat tank destroyer, and other Allied armored vehicles based on these. Continental versions of the R-975 for armored vehicles included the R-975E-C2, the R-975-C1, and the R-975-C4. 
In contrast to the 7,000 built by Wright, Continental built over 53,000 R-975 engines.

When installed in a tank, the R-975 did not have the benefit of being cooled by air slipstream or propeller blast, so a cooling fan was attached to the power shaft and surrounded by a shroud to provide the same effect.

After the war, Continental introduced its own R-975 version for aircraft, the R9-A. Though it was basically similar to other R-975 engines, and its compression ratio and supercharger gear ratio were unchanged from the R-975E-3, other improvements in the R9-A allowed it to achieve  for takeoff, surpassing any Wright version. A military version, the R-975-46, could reach , and was used in Piasecki's HUP Retriever and H-25 Army Mule helicopters. Continental's production of R-975 engines continued into the 1950s.

Other license-built R-975s
The engine was built in Spain as the Hispano-Suiza 9Q or Hispano-Wright 9Q without modification apart from the use of Hispano's patented nitriding finishing process and, on one version only, the 9Qdr, an epicyclic output speed reducer. The R-975 was also produced under licence by Fábrica Nacional de Motores in Brazil.

Variants
J-6-9 (R-975)
 at 2,000 RPM.
R-975-20
 for airship use
R-975E
 at 2,000 RPM. Higher power from improved cylinder head.
R-975E-1
 at 2,100 RPM. Higher compression ratio.
R-975E-3
Increased supercharging, slightly higher compression ratio.
R-975E-C2
 at 2,400 RPM. Built by Continental Motors under license for use in armored vehicles.
Continental R9-A
Continental's improved post-war version.
Hispano-Suiza 9Q
Licence built R-975 J-6 Whirlwind
Hispano-Suiza 9Qa
variant of the Licence built R-975 J-6 Whirlwind
Hispano-Suiza 9Qb
variant of the Licence built R-975 J-6 Whirlwind
Hispano-Suiza 9Qc
variant of the Licence built R-975 J-6 Whirlwind
Hispano-Suiza 9Qd
variant of the Licence built R-975 J-6 Whirlwind
Hispano-Suiza 9Qdr
variant of the Licence built R-975 J-6 Whirlwind

Applications

Wright J-6-9 and R-975

 ASJA L2
 Avro Anson Mk IV
 Beechcraft Staggerwing B17R, C17R, and D17R
 Bellanca CH-300 Pacemaker
 Berliner-Joyce OJ-2
 Caribbean Traders Husky III
 Cessna DC-6A Chief
 Curtiss Kingbird
 Curtiss-Wright CW-14 Travel Air/Speedwing/Sportsman Deluxe/Osprey
 Curtiss-Wright CW-22
 Curtiss-Wright SNC-1 Falcon
 de Havilland DH.75B Hawk Moth
 Dewoitine D.31
 Dewoitine D.35
 Douglas RD-1 & C-21/OA-3 Dolphin
 Emsco B-5 Challenger
 Goodyear K-1
 Curtiss F9C Sparrowhawk
 Fokker Universal
 Fokker C-5
 Fokker C-7
 Fokker C.XIV
 Fokker T.VIII
 Ford 4-AT-E Trimotor
 Interstate XTD3R
 Ireland N-2B Neptune
 Keystone XOK
 Keystone-Loening K-84 Commuter
 Koolhoven F.K.56
 Lockheed Model 12B Electra Junior
 McDonnell XV-1
 Messerschmitt M 18
 Noorduyn Norseman Mk.1
 North American BT-9
 North American NA-57
 North American NA-64 Yale
 Pitcairn PA-19
 Pitcairn-Cierva PCA-2/OP-1
 Pitcairn PA-33 & 34/OP-2
 Ryan B-5 Brougham
 Spartan C4-300
 Stearman Model 6C Cloudboy
 Stinson SM-1F Detroiter 
 Timm T-840
 Townsend Thunderbird (as rebuilt)
 Travel Air B9-4000
 Travel Air 6000B
 Travel Air Type R Mystery Ship
 VL Pyry
 Vultee BT-15 Valiant
 Waco JTO
 Waco JYO
 Waco JWM and JYM Mailplanes
 M4 Sherman

Continental R-975

 Beech D-18C
 Grizzly I cruiser - Canadian production of M4A1 Sherman tank
 Kangaroo armoured personnel carrier modification of M7 Priest and other vehicles
 Kellett XR-10
 M3 Lee 
 M4 Sherman
 M7 Priest
 M18 Hellcat
 M12 Gun Motor Carriage
 M40 Gun Motor Carriage
 McDonnell XV-1
 Piasecki HUP Retriever 
 Ram tank
 Sexton self-propelled gun
 Sikorsky XHJS-1 (S-53) - prototype helicopter
 Skink anti-aircraft tank - anti-aircraft vehicle based on Grizzly I

Engines on display
Some museums which have R-975 engines on display:
Pima Air & Space Museum in Tucson, Arizona has a Wright R-975.
 Hiller Aviation Museum in San Carlos, California has a Wright R-975.
 National Museum of Naval Aviation near Pensacola, Florida has a Continental R-975.
 Southern Museum of Flight in Birmingham, Alabama has a Continental R-975.
 Queensland Air Museum in Caloundra, Queensland, Australia has a Continental R-975.
 Lake Boga Catalina Museum (Lake Boga, Victoria, Australia) has a Continental Wright R-975.

Specifications (Whirlwind R-975E-3)

See also

References

Notes

Bibliography

. Available from the Aircraft Engine Historical Society's reference page.

. Available from the Aircraft Engine Historical Society's reference page.
The following Federal Aviation Administration type certificate data sheets, all available from the FAA's Regulatory and Guidance Library:
R-975E: .
R-975E-1: .
R-975E-3: .
Continental R9-A: .

External links

 Engine Data Sheets: US Aero Engines — R-975 page

Aircraft air-cooled radial piston engines
R-975
1920s aircraft piston engines
Tank engines